is a former Japanese professional baseball player and currently second squad manager for the Tohoku Rakuten Golden Eagles of the Nippon Professional Baseball (NPB). He previously played for the Seibu Lions, Nippon-Ham Fighters/Hokkaido Nippon-Ham Fighters and Chunichi Dragons of the NPB.

On October 14, 2019, Narahara become second squad manager for the Tohoku Rakuten Golden Eagles of NPB.

References

External links

1968 births
Living people
Aoyama Gakuin University alumni
Chunichi Dragons players
Hokkaido Nippon-Ham Fighters players
Japanese baseball coaches
Japanese baseball players
Nippon Ham Fighters players
Nippon Professional Baseball coaches
Nippon Professional Baseball infielders
Seibu Lions players
Baseball people from Saitama Prefecture